Mount Iba is the second-tallest mountain in the Zambales Mountains and the highest point in the province of Tarlac, Philippines. It is located in municipality of San Jose, Tarlac.

References

External links 
 https://www.britannica.com/place/Zambales-Mountains
 https://peakvisor.com/peak/mount-iba-scor1sbg.html

Mountains of the Philippines
Landforms of Tarlac